The 2016–17 Boston College Eagles men's basketball team represented Boston College during the 2016–17 NCAA Division I men's basketball season. The Eagles, led by third-year head coach Jim Christian, played their home games at the Conte Forum as members of the Atlantic Coast Conference. They finished the season 9–23, 2–16 in ACC play to finish in last place. As the No. 15 seed in the ACC tournament, they lost in the first round to Wake Forest.

Previous season
The Eagles finished the 2015–16 season with a record of 7–25, 0–18 to finish in last place in ACC play. This was the first time a team went winless in the ACC during a season. They lost to Florida State in the first round of the ACC tournament.

Departures

Incoming Transfers

Recruiting

Roster

Schedule and results 

|-
!colspan=9 style=| Exhibition

|-
!colspan=9 style=| Non-conference regular season

|-
!colspan=9 style=|ACC regular season

|-
!colspan=9 style=|ACC tournament

See also
 2016–17 Boston College Eagles women's basketball team

References

Boston College Eagles men's basketball seasons
Boston College
Boston College Eagles men's basketball
Boston College Eagles men's basketball
Boston College Eagles men's basketball
Boston College Eagles men's basketball